The Combellack Adobe Row House is an adobe row house located on Central Street in Tonopah, Nevada. The Tonopah Extension Mining Company built the home in 1903 to house its employees. The house is the oldest adobe home in Tonopah; its walls were cast in place rather than built in blocks, as the former method was more efficient and more popular in the town. The home was part of one of Tonopah's first residential areas on Central Street, which was a well-developed district by 1904. J.M. Combellack, who had lived in the home since it was built, became its owner in 1905.

The house was added to the National Register of Historic Places on May 20, 1982.

References

Tonopah, Nevada
Houses in Nye County, Nevada
Adobe buildings and structures
Houses completed in 1903
Houses on the National Register of Historic Places in Nevada
National Register of Historic Places in Tonopah, Nevada
Nevada State Register of Historic Places